Chidambaram  is an Indian film director and writer who works in Malayalam Cinema. He is known for his debut film Jan.E.Man (2021). He was born in Kannur. He is also the older brother of actor Ganapathi   who has co-written Jan.E.Man along with him. He was previously an assistant director to Jayaraj and worked in cinematography with Rajeev Ravi and KU Mohanan.

References

External links 

Malayalam film directors
Film directors from Kerala
Malayalam screenwriters
People from Kannur
Year of birth missing (living people)
Living people